For Better or For Worse is a Canadian comedy film, directed by Claude Jutra and released in 1975. The film centres on a day in the life of Bernard (Jutra) and Hélène (Monique Miller), a married couple in middle age whose relationship has grown stale, but who reach a renewed understanding and appreciation of each other after a fight brought on by Bernard's mistaken belief that Hélène is having an affair.

Its cast also includes Monique Mercure, Paul Savoie, Pierre Dufresne and Roger Garand.

The film was screened out of competition at the 1975 Cannes Film Festival. It had its Canadian premiere in September at the Stratford Film Festival, before opening commercially in October.

Reception
The film was seen by 188,579 people in France.

References

Works cited

External links

1975 films
1970s French-language films
Canadian comedy films
1975 comedy films
Films directed by Claude Jutra
French-language Canadian films
1970s Canadian films